Lancelot Dykes Spicer DSO, MC and Bar, (22 March 1893 – 6 December 1979), was a British Liberal Party politician.

Background
He was the youngest son of Rt Hon. Sir Albert Spicer, the Liberal Party politician. He was educated at Rugby School and Trinity College, Cambridge. He married in 1920, Iris Cox. They had one son who was killed in action on 31 May 1944. Iris obtained a divorce in 1935. Lancelot's second marriage, in 1951, was to Dorothy Beverley Gwyther.

War service
In the First World War he was granted temporary commission in the Army in September 1914. He was made T/Captain in July 1916 and Brigade-Major in April 1918. He served with the King's Own Yorkshire Light Infantry, was awarded the Military Cross in October 1917, bar to Military Cross in May 1918 and was made a Companion of the Distinguished Service Order in September 1918.

Professional career
He was a Director of the family paper manufacturing business Spicers Ltd serving as Chairman from 1950 to 1959. He served as President of the Stationers' Association of Britain and Ireland.

Political career
In November 1941 he was a founder of the Liberal Action Group, a pressure group inside of the Liberal Party that lobbied for the party to withdraw from the wartime electoral truce. 
In 1943 he was selected as Liberal prospective parliamentary candidate for the Walthamstow West Division of Essex and at the 1945 General Election finished second.

He was Liberal candidate for the Kensington South Division of London at the 1945 Kensington South by-election where he finished second.

He did not stand for parliament again.

References

External links 
Sir Archibald Sinclair:https://books.google.com/books?id=J7XiewCEo5wC&pg=PA207&dq=lancelot+spicer+liberal&hl=en&sa=X&ei=GU_WUsIUrKDsBuTlgYAO&ved=0CDYQuwUwAA#v=onepage&q=lancelot%20spicer%20&f=false
Liberal Action Group:https://books.google.com/books?id=qps14mSlghcC&pg=PA316&dq=lancelot+spicer+liberal&hl=en&sa=X&ei=9U_WUr29IuTW7Qa4sYAQ&ved=0CDkQ6AEwAQ#v=onepage&q=lancelot%20spicer%20liberal&f=false

1893 births
1979 deaths
Alumni of Trinity College, Cambridge
Recipients of the Military Cross
Companions of the Distinguished Service Order
Liberal Party (UK) parliamentary candidates
Younger sons of baronets